Wendell H. Ford Airport  is a public airport located 10 miles (16 km) northwest of the central business district of Hazard, a city in Perry County, Kentucky, United States. It is named for former Kentucky Senator and Governor Wendell H. Ford.

Facilities and aircraft
For the 12-month period ending September 21, 2006, the airport had 10,200 aircraft operations, an average of 27 per day: 85% general aviation, 13% air taxi and 2% military.

References

External links

Airports in Kentucky
Transportation in Perry County, Kentucky
Buildings and structures in Perry County, Kentucky